Motobdella is a genus of leeches in the family Erpobdellidae. It contains two species:

Motobdella montezuma  (Davies, Singhal, and Blinn, 1985) 
Motobdella sedonensis Govedich, Blinn, Keim & Davies, 1998

References

Leeches
Annelid genera